The Same Old Blues is the debut album from UK rock group Proud Mary. The album was recorded at Wheeler End Studios in November 2000 over a period of 7 days and released on Noel Gallagher's Sour Mash label. The album was produced by Noel Gallagher assisted by Gem Archer, engineered by Stan Kybert and mixed by Mark "Spike" Stent at Olympic Studios in London. The album was released in June, 2001 and reached #94 on the UK album charts.

Track listing 
"Give a Little Love"
"Very Best Friend"
"Dont it all Look Ugly"
"All Good Things"
"Somewhere Down the Line"
"Time on Our Hands"
"Just for You"
"Salt of the Earth" (Mick Jagger, Keith Richards)
"Same Old Blues"

Personnel 
Greg Griffin – vocals
Paul Newsome – guitars, vocals, harmonica
Adam Gray – guitars, pedal steel
Noel Gallagher – bass, guitars, vocals, percussion
Terry Kirkbride – drums, vocals, percussion
Mikey Rowe – piano, organ
Andy Bell – guitar
Gem Archer – guitar

References

External links 
 

2001 debut albums
Albums recorded at Wheeler End Studios
Proud Mary (band) albums